Richard Lamont Jordan (born December 1, 1974) is a former American football linebacker who played two seasons with the Detroit Lions of the National Football League. He was drafted by the Detroit Lions in the seventh round of the 1997 NFL Draft. He played college football at Missouri Southern State University and attended Vian High School in Vian, Oklahoma. Jordan was also a member of the Kansas City Chiefs. Now lives in Alpharetta, Georgia and is starting an improv comedy troupe.

Professional career
Jordan was drafted by the Detroit Lions with the 239th pick in the 1997 NFL Draft. He played for the Lions from 1997 to 1999.

He signed with the Kansas City Chiefs on January 18, 2001. He was released by the Chiefs on September 2, 2001. He signed a two-year future contract with the Chiefs on January 30, 2002. Jordan was released by the Chiefs on September 1, 2002.

Jordan was signed by the Detroit Lions on October 1, 2002.

References

External links
Just Sports Stats

Living people
1974 births
Players of American football from Oklahoma
American football linebackers
African-American players of American football
Missouri Southern Lions football players
Detroit Lions players
People from Holdenville, Oklahoma
21st-century African-American sportspeople
20th-century African-American sportspeople